"All I Want" is a song and single by Australian singer and actress Melissa Tkautz. There was no promotional video for "All I Want", and the single was only a minor chart success in Australia, peaking at number 72 in the singles chart.

Formats and track listings

Australian CD single 6-tracks
 "All I Want" (PLW Radio Edit)
 "All I Want" (007 Radio Edit)
 "All I Want" (DJ Luke Leal vs 4Play Radio Edit)
 "All I Want" (007 Club Mix)
 "All I Want" (007 Club Mix)
 "All I Want" (JimmyZ vs Diego V's 4Play Club Mix)

Australian CD single 7-tracks
 "All I Want" (PLW Radio Edit) – 3:34
 "All I Want" (007 Radio Edit Mix) – 3:20
 "All I Want" (DJ Luke Leal vs Peachy Radio Edit) – 3:49
 "All I Want" (JimmyZ vs Diego V's 4Play Radio Edit) – 4:27
 "All I Want" (007 Club Mix) – 5:49
 "All I Want" (DJ Luke Leal vs Peachy Remix) – 8:11
 "All I Want" (JimmyZ vs Diego V's 4Play Club Mix) – 6:45

Charts

References

External links
 JRB Music & Management site.
 Rajon Music Group site.

2005 singles
Melissa Tkautz songs
Dance-pop songs
2005 songs